This article is about the particular significance of the year 1883 to Wales and its people.

Incumbents

Archdruid of the National Eisteddfod of Wales – Clwydfardd

Lord Lieutenant of Anglesey – William Owen Stanley 
Lord Lieutenant of Brecknockshire – Joseph Bailey, 1st Baron Glanusk
Lord Lieutenant of Caernarvonshire – Edward Douglas-Pennant, 1st Baron Penrhyn 
Lord Lieutenant of Cardiganshire – Edward Pryse
Lord Lieutenant of Carmarthenshire – John Campbell, 2nd Earl Cawdor 
Lord Lieutenant of Denbighshire – William Cornwallis-West  
Lord Lieutenant of Flintshire – Hugh Robert Hughes
Lord Lieutenant of Glamorgan – Christopher Rice Mansel Talbot 
Lord Lieutenant of Merionethshire – Edward Lloyd-Mostyn, 2nd Baron Mostyn
Lord Lieutenant of Monmouthshire – Henry Somerset, 8th Duke of Beaufort
Lord Lieutenant of Montgomeryshire – Edward Herbert, 3rd Earl of Powis
Lord Lieutenant of Pembrokeshire – William Edwardes, 4th Baron Kensington
Lord Lieutenant of Radnorshire – Arthur Walsh, 2nd Baron Ormathwaite 

Bishop of Bangor – James Colquhoun Campbell
Bishop of Llandaff – Richard Lewis (from 25 April)
Bishop of St Asaph – Joshua Hughes 
Bishop of St Davids – Basil Jones

Events
27 January – In the same storm, the James Gray is wrecked on Tusker Rocks, Porthcawl, and the Agnes Jack off Port Eynon. The Mumbles lifeboat puts out, and 5 of its crew are drowned in the rescue attempt, in which Jessie Ace and Margaret Wright assist.
16 February – Six million tons of rock collapse at the Welsh Slate Company's underground quarry at Blaenau Ffestiniog.
1 February – Five miners are killed in an accident at the Lewis Merthyr Colliery.
25 June – Six miners are killed in an accident at the New Duffryn Colliery, Rhymney.
July – The steamship Rishanglys leaves three seamen, who are believed to be suffering from cholera, on the island of Flat Holm; one of them subsequently dies.
21 August – Five miners are killed in an accident at the Gelli Colliery, Gelli, Glamorgan.
24 October – Cardiff University opens (under the name of University College of South Wales and Monmouthshire).
31 October – 18 people are drowned when the German barque Alhambra sinks off Holyhead.
13 November – Merthyr Tydfil-born Samuel Griffith becomes Premier of Queensland for the first time.
c. November? – Closure of Point of Ayr lighthouse.
Peak year for zinc production in Wales.
Penydarren Ironworks closes completely.
Welsh-Canadian artist Robert Harris is commissioned to paint the Meeting of the Delegates of British North America.

Arts and literature

Awards
National Eisteddfod of Wales  – held at Cardiff
Chair – No winner
Crown – Anna Walter Thomas

New books
Rhoda Broughton – Belinda
Amy Dillwyn – A Burglary; or Unconscious Influence
John Jones (Myrddin Fardd) – Adgof Uwch Anghof
Robert Owen – Pilgrimage to Rome 
Robert Williams (Trebor Mai) – Gwaith Barddonol Trebor Mai (posthumously published)

Music
Treorchy Male Voice Choir formed.

Sport
Football – Wrexham win the Welsh Cup for the second time in its six-year history.
Rugby union
Wales take part in the inaugural Home Nations Championship
First home international game played, hosted at St. Helen's Rugby and Cricket Ground in Swansea.
First Wales match against Scotland. Wales lose by three goals to one.

Births
6 January (in Shirehampton) – Harry Uzzell, Wales international rugby union captain (died 1960)
23 March – William Evans, Wales dual code international rugby player (died 1946)
30 April – David John de Lloyd, composer (died 1948)
7 May – Gomer Berry, 1st Viscount Kemsley, newspaper magnate (died 1968)
12 May (in Glasgow) – James Walker, MP for Newport 1929–31 (died 1945)
28 May (in Gayton) – Clough Williams-Ellis, architect (died 1978)
12 June (in London) – Margaret Mackworth, 2nd Viscountess Rhondda, suffragette (died 1958)
8 August –  Iesu Grist Price, son of William Price (died 1884)
13 September (in South Shields) – Percy Thomas, architect (died 1969)
14 October – Dick Thomas, Wales international rugby player (died 1916)
23 November – James 'Tuan' Jones, Wales and British Lion rugby player (died 1964)
13 December – Sir Frederick Rees, historian and academic (died 1967)
date unknown – John Jones (Tydu), poet (died 1968)

Deaths
25 January – John Elias Davies, harpist, 35
29 January 
John Owen (Owain Alaw), composer, 61
Owen Gethin Jones, industrialist and poet, 66
May – John Batchelor, businessman and politician, 63
28 May – Hugh Jones, Principal of Llangollen Baptist College, 51
18 August – Roger Vaughan, Benedictine monk and priest, Archbishop of Sydney, 49
5 November – James Walton, Yorkshire-born textile inventor and industrialist, 80
8 November – William Rees (Gwilym Hiraethog), poet, 81
25 December – Townshend Mainwaring, politician, 76

References

Wales